Adebayo, also spelled Adébáyọ̀ or Adebayor in French, is a given name and surname. It is a traditional Yoruba name which could mean any of the following “he came in a joyful time”, or "the king/crown/royalty meets joy" or "greatness/nobility/primacy/power enjoined with joy".

Surname 
Adedayo Adebayo (born 1970), English rugby player (of Nigerian descent)
Ayobami Adebayo (born 1988), Nigerian writer
Bam Adebayo (born 1997), American professional basketball player
Bo Adebayo (born 1988), Canadian football defensive lineman
Cornelius Adebayo (born 1941), Nigerian government official
Diran Adebayo (born 1968), British novelist, critic and broadcaster
Dotun Adebayo (born 1960), British radio presenter
Elijah Adebayo, English footballer
Emmanuel Adebayor (born 1984), Togolese footballer
Femi Adebayo (born 1972), Nigerian lawyer, actor, director and producer
Niyi Adebayo (born 1958), Nigerian governor, 1999-2003 current Minister of Trade, Industry & Investment for Nigeria (2019-date)
Robert Adeyinka Adebayo (born 1928), governor of Western State of Nigeria, 1966–1971
Sunday Adebayo (born 1973), Nigerian professional basketball player

Given name 
Adebayo Adedeji (1930–2018), Nigerian economist and academic
Adebayo Adefarati (1931–2007), Nigerian politician
Adebayo Adelabu (born 1970), Nigerian politician
Adebayo Adeleye (born 2000), Nigerian football goalkeeper
Adebayo Adewusi (born 1958), Nigerian academic, lawyer, public administrator, and politician
Adebayo Adigun (born 1990), Nigerian footballer
Adebayo Akinde (born 1946), Nigerian academic and bishop
Adebayo Akinfenwa (born 1982), English footballer
Adebayo Alao-Akala (1950–2022), Nigerian politician
Adebayo Alonge, Nigerian pharmacist, inventor, deep tech entrepreneur, and market development professional
Adebayo Johnson Bankole (born 1945), Nigerian politician
Adebayo Bolaji (born 1983), English painter, actor, writer, and director
Adebayo Faleti (1921–2017), Nigerian newscaster, stage director, film editor, and librarian
Adebayo Gbadebo (born 1974), Nigerian footballer and manager
Adebayo Lawal (born 1941), Nigerian politician
Adebayo Ogunlesi (born 1953), Nigerian lawyer and investment banker
Adebayo Oladapo (born 1940), Nigerian sprinter
Adebayo Osinowo (1955–2020), Nigerian businessman and politician, also known as Pepper
Adebayo Salami (1951–2021), Nigerian politician
Adebayo Salami (born 1952), Nigerian actor, filmmaker, movie producer, and director, known professionally as Oga Bello

Compound name 
Marsha Coleman-Adebayo

References 

Yoruba-language surnames
Yoruba given names